The  Agricultural Holdings Act 1948 was an Act of Parliament passed in the United Kingdom by the Labour government of Prime Minister Clement Attlee. It provided tenant farmers with security of tenure for life.

Notes

External links
 

United Kingdom Acts of Parliament 1948
Agriculture legislation in the United Kingdom